El Castillo de Kafka is an iconic complex of 90 apartments in Sant Pere de Ribes, near Sitges in Catalonia, Spain. It was designed by Ricardo Bofill Taller de Arquitectura and completed in 1968. It has been ranked among "Ricardo Bofill's 10 Most Iconic Works".

It was inspired by the Utopian practice of Archigram and its "plug-in city" concept of modular megastructures. Its name is an explicit reference to The Castle, the 1926 novel by Franz Kafka.

See also
 La Muralla Roja
 Walden 7
 Les Espaces d'Abraxas
 List of works by Ricardo Bofill Taller de Arquitectura

Notes

1968 establishments in Spain
Ricardo Bofill buildings
Buildings and structures in Catalonia